A matchbook is a small paperboard folder enclosing a quantity of matches and having a coarse striking surface on the exterior.

Matchbook may also refer to:

 Matchbook (Ralph Towner & Gary Burton album), 1974
 Matchbook (Ian Moss album), 1989
 Matchbook FX, an internet-based electronic communication network
 Matchbook Romance, rock music group